The 1943 Colorado Buffaloes football team was an American football team that represented the University of Colorado as a member of the Mountain States Conference (MSC) during the 1943 college football season. Led by third-year head coach James J. Yeager, the Buffaloes compiled an overall record of 5–2 with a mark of 2–0 in conference play, winning the MSC title.

Schedule

References

Colorado
Colorado Buffaloes football seasons
Mountain States Conference football champion seasons
Colorado Buffaloes football